The University of Ghana is a public university located in Accra, Ghana. It the oldest and largest of the thirteen Ghanaian national public universities.  

The university was founded in 1948 as the University College of the Gold Coast in the British colony of the Gold Coast. It was originally an affiliate college of the University of London, which supervised its academic programs and awarded degrees. After Ghana gained independence in 1957, the college was renamed the University College of Ghana. It changed its name again to the University of Ghana in 1961, when it gained full university status. 

The University of Ghana is situated on the West view of the Accra Legon hills and at the northeast of the centre of Accra. It has over 40,000 registered students.

Introduction
The original emphasis on establishing the University of Ghana was on the liberal arts, social sciences, law, basic science, agriculture and medicine. However, as part of a national educational reform program, the university's curriculum was expanded to provide more technology-based and vocational courses as well as postgraduate training.

The University of Ghana which is mainly based at Legon, about 12 kilometres northeast of the center of Accra has its medical school in the town called Korle-Bu, with a teaching hospital and a secondary/external campus in the city of Accra. It also has a graduate school of nuclear and Allied Sciences at the Ghana Atomic Energy Commission, making it one of the few universities on the African continent offering programs in nuclear physics and nuclear engineering.

The University of Ghana Logo 

The logo is made up of two colors: Indigo Dye and Camel. The blue shield with three "AYA" standing upright in top half and "DWENINMENTOASO" in the middle of bottom half, all embossed in gold. The logo was designed by A. M. Opoku. "AYA" (Akan word for fern) is an Adinkra symbol. The "AYA" grows straight and it is used here to represent truthfulness and an ability to stay upright.

Ram's Horns: 'Dweninmen' (Akan word for Ram's Horn) is an Adinkra symbol. Here, two interlocking ram's horns (DWENINMENTOASO) have been used to symbolise strength and a call to pursue a path of integrity.

History
The formation of the West African Commission of the Asquith Commission on Higher Education in the Colonies under the chairmanship of Rt. Hon. Walter Elliot was the birth of this notable institution in 1948. The commission recommended the setting up of university colleges in association with the University of London, thus the University College of the Gold Coast was founded by Ordinance on 11 August 1948 for the purpose of providing for and promoting university education, learning and research. This was made possible by the rejection of the first recommendation which stated that only one university college was feasible for the whole of British West Africa, which would be located in Nigeria by the people of Gold Coast.

In the book commissioned by the University of Ghana, Professor Francis Agbodeka (1998) found that "Two members of the Legislative Council - Dr J. B. Danquah and Prof. Christian Baeta on their own volition worked on the question of securing funds for the project. More significant, F. M. Bourret (1949), in almost a contemporaneous account, reported that the strong and united opinion expressed by Dr. Nanka-Bruce in a Radio Station Zoy address to the People of the Gold Coast in October 1947, “was largely instrumental in influencing the Secretary of State for the colonies” to finally give his consent in 1947, “for the establishment of a Gold Coast university college.” Historically, in those days, long before the advent of television, entire communities and groups would listen to news, sports, and entertainment, broadcast from Radio Station Zoy, the BBC, and other stations on the short wave radio band, to a single radio set.

Significantly, the establishment of the University of Ghana, based on the Elliot Commission's Majority Report (of which Sir Arku Korsah of the Gold Coast was a member), was the culmination of immense work of several organizations, committees, institutions, and prominent individuals, at home and abroad. Among some of the most prominent Ghanaians, members of organizations and civil society groups that campaigned for the establishment of the University of College of the Gold Coast/Ghana, included also Dr. Nanka-Bruce, Rev. Prof. C. G. Baeta, and Sir E. Asafu-Adjaye, Dr. J. B. Danquah, included. The Asantehene, Otomfuo Nana Agyemang Prempeh, II, agreed to the proposition after the Elliot Commission proposed establishment of a university in Kumasi, in the Ashanti Region. In sum, the Gold Coast citizenry, as a collective, successfully advocated for the establishment of the University Collège of the Gold Coast in association with the University of London, in 1948, after the Elliot Commission report, on which Sir Arku Korsah of the Gold Coast sat.

In 1961 the Government of Ghana under Kwame Nkrumah passed the University of Ghana Act, 1961 (Act 79) to replace the then University College of Ghana. Through that act, the university attained sovereign university status and mandate to award its own degrees.

Office of the Chancellor 

Mrs. Mary Chinery-Hesse is the current Chancellor of the university. She was elected as Chancellor and subsequently inducted into office on Wednesday, August 1, 2018, at a Special Congregation of the university held in the Great Hall.

Past Chancellors of the University 
Until the year 1998, the Head of State acted as Chancellor of the University of Ghana.  Thus, from 1961 when the University of Ghana was established by an Act of Parliament, the first Head of State of independent Ghana, Dr. Kwame Nkrumah became the first Chancellor of the University of Ghana.

The following have held the position of Chancellor of the university: 
 Dr. Kwame Nkrumah (1961–1965)
 General Joseph Arthur Ankrah (1966–1968)
 General Akwasi Amankwa Afrifa (1969)
 Justice Edward Akufo-Addo (1970–1971)
 General Ignatius Kutu Acheampong (1972–1978)
 Fred Akuffo (1978-1979)
 Dr. Hilla Limann (1979–1981)
 Flt. Lt. Jerry John Rawlings (1982–1991)
 Oyeeman Wereko Ampem II (1998–2005)
 Kofi Annan (2008–2018)

Office of the Vice-Chancellor 

Nana Aba Appiah Amfo is the current Vice-Chancellor of the University of Ghana. In July 2021, she was appointed as the Acting Vice Chancellor. Later in October 2021, she appointed as Vice-Chancellor of the University of Ghana. Her appointment took effect from 26 October 2021. She become the first woman to occupy the position of Vice-Chancellor in the University.

Past vice-chancellors and principals 
The following have held the position of vice-chancellors and principals of the university:

University College of the Gold Coast
 David Mowbray Balme (1948–1957), Principal
University College of Ghana
 David Mowbray Balme (1957–1958), Principal
 Raymond Henry Stoughton (1958–1961), Principal
University of Ghana
 Conor Cruise O'Brien (1962–1965), Vice-Chancellor
Alexander Kwapong (1966–1975), Vice-Chancellor
Daniel Adzei Bekoe (1976–1983), Vice-Chancellor
Akilagpa Sawyerr (1985–1992), Vice-Chancellor
George Benneh (1992–1996), Vice-Chancellor
Ivan Addae-Mensah (1996–2002), Vice-Chancellor
Kwadwo Asenso-Okyere (2002–2006), Vice-Chancellor
Clifford Nii-Boi Tagoe (2006–2010), Vice-Chancellor
Ernest Aryeetey (2010–2016), Vice-Chancellor
Ebenezer Oduro Owusu (2016–2021), Vice-Chancellor
Nana Aba Appiah Amfo (2021-Date), Vice-Chancellor

Academics

The Balme Library

The Balme Library was established in 1948 as the Achimota College Library. It is the main library of the university's library network.
The Balme library is located on the main campus of the university.

College of Health Sciences
There are six Schools and one Research Institute under this college. They include:

School of Medicine and Dentistry
School of Biomedical and Allied Health Sciences
School of Nursing, located on the Legon campus though its students receive practical training at the Korle-Bu Teaching Hospital
School of Pharmacy
School of Public Health
School of Education and Leadership
Noguchi Memorial Institute for Medical Research
Centre for Tropical, Clinical Pharmacology & Therapeutics

College of Basic and Applied Sciences

There are five Schools, six Centres (3 research based) and two Institutes under this college. They include:

 School of Physical and Mathematical Sciences
 School of Biological Sciences
 School of Agriculture
 School of Engineering Sciences
 School of Veterinary Medicine
 Livestock and Poultry Research Centre (LIPREC)
 Soil and Irrigation Research Centre (SIREC)
 Forest and Horticultural Research Centre (FOHCREC)
 Biotechnology Centre
 West African Centre for Crop Improvement (WACCI)
 West African Centre for Cell Biology and Infectious Pathogens (WACCBIP)
 Institute of Environment and Sanitation Studies
 Institute of Applied Sciences and Technology

Collegiate system
Starting from the 2014/2015 academic year, the University of Ghana adopted the collegiate system and thus categorized all schools and departments under four colleges, which are:
College of Basic and Applied Sciences
College of Humanities
College of Education
College of Health Sciences

Other faculties
There are five faculties outside the above Colleges and they include:
Faculty of Arts 
Faculty of Social Studies

Faculty of Science
Faculty of Law: first established as a department of the Faculty of Social Studies in the 1958/59 academic year, became a full-fledged faculty in the 1960/61 academic year. From the 2012/2013 academic year, the university will admit fresh Senior High School (S.H.S) students into the LLB first-degree program, but will retain the post-first degree program. Thus the university will have two entry means to the Faculty of Law.
Faculty of Engineering Sciences

International Programmes Office 
The International Programmes Office of University of Ghana (Office of International Programmes, IPO) was established in 1997 to harmonize the university's international efforts. It promotes all international activities, including admission of international students, Memorandums of Understanding between the university and international educational institutions, visiting scholars, study abroad programmes, staff and student exchange programmes and research collaboration. The Office is mandated to represent the university on the international front. Due to the efforts of the Office, the university has over 200 agreements with educational institutions all over the world, and works with organizations such as Council on International Educational Exchange CIEE, California State University CSU, University of California Education Abroad Programme , and International Society of Education Planners  to facilitate student exchange programmes. The Office is headed by Prof. Eric Osei-Assibey, who serves as Dean.

Website: http://ipo.ug.edu.gh/

University of Ghana Campuses

Legon Campus 
The Legon Campus lies about 13 kilometers north-east of Accra, the capital of Ghana. This is where most of the university's teaching and research are carried out. The Legon Campus also houses the central administration of the university. there are a number of student residences located on the Legon Campus.

Korle-Bu Campus 
The Korle-Bu Campus, headed by a Provost, houses the administration of the College of Health Sciences. Some of the constituent schools are also located on the Korle-Bu Campus; the School of Medicine and Dentistry and the School of Allied Health Sciences.

Accra City Campus 
This campus is strategically located in the heart of the city and precisely at Adabraka and opposite the Ministry of Information.

Distance Education Campuses
The university has Distance Education campuses in the various regions where it runs a variety of programs, including degree courses. Awudome College has residential facilities that enable running of short courses, over weekends and other durations.
 Accra Workers' College, (now Accra City campus), Accra
 Awudome Residential Workers' College, Tsito
 Bolgatanga Workers' College, Bolgatanga
 Cape Coast Workers' College, Cape Coast
 Ho Workers' College, Ho
 Koforidua Workers' College, Koforidua
 Kumasi Workers' College, Kumasi
 Takoradi Workers' College, Sekondi-Takoradi
 Tamale Workers' College, Tamale
 Tema Workers' College, Tema
 Sunyani Workers' College, Sunyani
 Wa Workers' College, Wa

Institutional Affiliations

 Accra College of Medicine, Accra
 African University College of Business & Technology, Accra
 Catholic University College, Sunyani
 Christian Service University College, Kumasi
 Family Health Medical School, Accra
 Ghana Armed Forces Command and Staff College, Accra
 Ghana Institute of Languages, Accra
Institute of Accountancy Training, Accra
 Islamic University College, Accra
 Knustford University College, Accra
 Methodist University College, Accra
 Narh-Bita College, Tema
 Nightingale School of Nursing, Accra
 National Film and Television Institute (NAFTI), Accra
 Presbyterian University College, Mpraeso/Abetifi-Kwahu
 Regional Maritime University, Accra
 St. Peter's Seminary, Cape-Coast
 St. Paul's Seminary, Sowutuom-Achimota
 St. Victor's Seminary, Tamale
 Western Hills School of Nursing, Accra
 Wisconsin International University College, Accra

Reputation

The Times Higher Education World University Rankings of 2018 ranks the University of Ghana at the 800-1000th place globally and 17th in Africa (rank shared with other universities).

Research and learning centres
The Graduate School of Nuclear and Allied Sciences is a post-graduate school established by Ghana Atomic Energy Commission (GAEC) in collaboration with the University of Ghana, with support from the International Atomic Energy Agency (IAEA) to enhance human resources development for the peaceful use of nuclear and related technologies in Ghana and Africa. SNAS is part of the Faculty of Science, University of Ghana and locate at Kwabenya.

Facilities

Halls of residence
The halls of residence of the University of Ghana has been described as "home away from home." Halls of residence are provided for graduate and undergraduate students. There are also flats and guest rooms for senior members and guests. There are main halls of residence by the Government of Ghana and private halls of residence built on campus by individuals and corporate bodies. Below are descriptions of the halls of residence; Commonwealth Hall, Legon Hall, Mensah Sarbah Hall, Volta Hall, Akuafo Hall and Jubilee Hall at the University of Ghana, Legon. 
Commonwealth Hall (the university's only male hall of residence). Known as the Vandals Hall, the word VANDALS is an acronym for Vivacious, Affable, Neighborly, Devoted, Altruistic and Loyal. For the name vandals, the students of the Commonwealth Hall recognized themselves with the common name known as 'V' Mates with a response word 'Sharp'. The males of this hall believe in and uphold customs and traditions. The VANDALS are said to represent the voices of the entire student body, making known students' cases and issues, for appropriate solutions from authorities. Often clad in red, as the colour of their identity, ladies who wore red attire to their environment had always been cheered for identifying with them. The VANDALs pride themselves with leadership qualities and unity, making the old VANDALS always proud.
Legon Hall (The Legon Hall is the premier hall of the University of Ghana). Legon Hall was the first hall of residence to be considered and built on the University of Ghana campus, thus referred to as the Premier Hall. The Hall is located at the Centre of the school close to the biggest library (the Balme Library) in the West African region. Just like the Mensah Sarbah Hall and the Akuafo Hall, Legon Hall serves as home for both male and female students, allowing for strong bonds between the sexes on the campus. Legon Hall has produced a number of prominent personalities. The motto of the Legon hall is; "Cui Multidum Datum", which means "human relations with examples".
Mensah Sarbah Hall (The Mensah Sarbah Hall is the first hall to be named after a hero of the nation; Dr. Mensah Sarbah). The hall is recognised to host most of the best athletes on the university campus, influencing laurels.
Volta Hall (the university's female-only hall of residence). It is the only all-female hall on campus known for their discipline and neatness. The hall has churned out many respectable women such as the first female Chief Justice Georgina Theodora Woode.
Akuafo Hall The word "akuafo" is an Akan word which means farmers. For this reason the hall is notably called the Farmers hall with a rich Ghanaian culture and tradition. The Akuafo Hall was the second hall of residence to be established in the University of Ghana. Their chieftaincy institution serves as a symbol of unity for students and also helps to promote and showcase the rich Ghanaian culture. The chief farmer and his queen mother are elected annually.
Jubilee Hall. The Jubilee Hall is one of the halls of residence of the University of Ghana, Legon. The Jubilee hall is located on the south of the university campus, and opposite to the International Students Hostel. Jubilee Hall was built to commemorate the university's Golden Jubilee celebration in 1998. The hall was mainly built through support funds from alumni of the university.
The university has eight newly created halls of residence that were commissioned in 2011. They are:
Alexander Kwapong Hall, named after Professor Alexander Kwapong a former Vice-Chancellor and Chairman of the Council of State.
Jean Nelson Akah Hall, named after an alumnus, Jean Nelson Akah. It was inaugurated in July 2010. Its emblem shows a candle, a book and a pen to symbolize perseverance. It was designed by a final year Physics-Computer Science major student Raymond Sung-Seh Harrison. The motto of the hall, "Lux in Tenebris", which is Latin for "Light in Darkness", was suggested by Raymond's mate at the time, a lady by the name Muna Twerefour. The emblem was officially adopted on Tuesday, 2 April 2013.
Hilla Limann Hall, the first of the University of Ghana Enterprise Limited (UGEL) hostels to be completed. It was inaugurated in July 2010, during which the Vice-Chancellor announced the decision to name it after Dr. Hilla Limann, a former President of the Republic of Ghana. Senior members of the university may be assigned as Fellows of the Hall by the Vice Chancellor. Students assigned/affiliated to the Hall form the Junior members. The Head of the Hall, Senior Tutor and fellow tutors serve as a body which helps with the governing of the Hall.
Elizabeth Sey Hall, the second of the newer halls built by University of Ghana Enterprise Limited (UGEL) Hostels to be completed. It was inaugurated in July 2010 and was named after the first female graduate of the university, Elizabeth Frances Baaba Sey.
Africa Union Hall, formerly called Pentagon, built by Social Security and National Insurance Trust (SSNIT).
James Topp Nelson Yankah Hall, formerly known as Teachers Fund (TF) Hostel.
Bani Hall, initially a private hostel and later had transferred to the status of a hall after the tenancy agreement with the university had elapsed.
Evandy Hall, formerly Evandy Hostel and this was turned into a hall after the tenancy agreement with the university elapsed and ownership transferred to University authorities,

Hostels
There are ten university hostels: the International Students Hostels (I and II), the Valco Trust Hostel, the Commonwealth Hall, the Akuafo Hall, the Mensah Sarbah Hall, the Legon Hall, the Limann Hall, the Kwapong Hall, the Elizabeth Sey Hall and the Jean Akah Nelson hall. There are also private hostels, SSNIT Hostels (Ghana Hostels also known as Pentagon).

Bank, postal and other services
Ghana Commercial Bank, Standard Chartered Bank, Barclays Bank, Cal Bank, HFC Bank, Access Bank, Stanbic Bank,Fidelity Bank, Ecobank Ghana and Prudential Bank have branches on the Legon campus. There is a branch of the national postal service (Ghana Post) on campus. Other banks have ATMs on campus.

Roads usage and user charges
From 1 February 2014, all vehicles entering the University of Ghana's main campus, and also those using the road passing through the Staff Village of the university were required to pay charges. This was heavily criticized by public and students and was therefore suspended. Currently, various entry points into the campus require vehicle owners (typically staff and students) to obtain electronically scannable cards issued and authorized by the transport unit of the university.

Notable alumni

 Barbara Frances Ackah-Yensu – active justice of the Supreme Court of Ghana (2022–)
 George Kingsley Acquah – Chief Justice of Ghana (2003–2007)
 Hutton Ayikwei Addy – Professor of Public Health, first Dean of the University for Development Studies Medical School 
 Edward Doe Adjaho – Speaker of Parliament of Ghana (2013–2017)
 Sophia Ophilia Adjeibea Adinyira – justice of the Supreme Court of Ghana (2006–2019)
 Peter Ala Adjetey – former speaker of the Parliament of Ghana (2001–05)
 Kwadwo Afari-Gyan – Chairman of the Electoral Commission of Ghana (1992–15)
 Francis Agbodeka – former professor of History
 Kissi Agyebeng – Special Prosecutor (2021–)
 Ama Ataa Aidoo – playwright
 Vida Akoto-Bamfo – Justice of the Supreme Court of Ghana (2009 – 2019)
Ebenezer Akuete – Former Ghanaian diplomat 
 Sophia Akuffo, 13th Chief Justice of Ghana
 Nana Addo Dankwa Akufo-Addo – President of Ghana (2017–present) 
 Daniel Afedzi Akyeampong – mathematician
 Akwasi Afrifa (Ghanaian MP) – former member of parliament 
 Mabel Agyemang née Banful (also Yamoa) - Appeal Court judge for the Commonwealth Secretariat, served in the judiciaries of the governments of Ghana, The Gambia and Swaziland
 Nene Amegatcher – active Justice of the Supreme Court of Ghana (2018–)
 Paa Kwesi Amissah-Arthur – Vice President of the Republic of Ghana 2012–17
 Patrick Amoah-Ntim – Retired Ghanaian diplomat 
 K. Y. Amoako – former UN Under-Secretary-General and Executive Secretary of the Economic Commission for Africa
Harry Reginald Amonoo – Former Ghanaian diplomat
David Anaglate – Journalist, Director General of the Ghana Broadcasting Corporation (1992–1995)
Goodwin Tutum Anim – First Ghanaian Managing Director of the Ghana News Agency
 Yaw Appau – active Justice of the Supreme Court of Ghana (2015–)
 Anas Aremeyaw Anas – investigative journalist with Insight TWI: The World Investigates, CEO of Tiger Eye Private Investigations, executive director of The Crusading Guide
 Kwasi Anin-Yeboah – Current Chief Justice of Ghana (2019–)
 Joyce Rosalind Aryee - Minister of Education (1985–1987), Member of the National Defence Council (1993-2001), received Second Highest State Award, the Companion of the Order of the Volta in 2006
 Benjamin Teiko Aryeetey – Justice of the Supreme Court of Ghana (2009–2011)
Yaw Asare, dramatist and playwright
 Samuel Kwame Adibu Asiedu – active justice of the Supreme Court of Ghana (2022–)
 Kofi Awoonor – Ghanaian poet and author whose work combined the poetic traditions of his native Ewe people and contemporary and religious symbolism to depict Africa during decolonization
 George Ayittey – economist, author, and president of the Free Africa Foundation, professor at American University, associate scholar at the Foreign Policy Research Institute.
 Elizabeth-Irene Baitie – award-winning writer of young adult fiction
 Josiah Ofori Boateng, Justice of the Supreme Court of Ghana (1999–2001); Electoral Commissioner of Ghana (1989–1992)
 Kwesi Botchwey – former law lecturer and finance minister of Ghana (1982–95).
 Mohamed Ibn Chambas – Executive Secretary of the Economic Community of West African States.
 Phyllis Christian – lawyer, CEO of ShawbellConsulting
Alexander Adu Clerk –  sleep medicine specialist and psychiatrist
George C. Clerk – pioneer botanist and plant pathologist
Nicholas T. Clerk – academic, public administrator and Presbyterian minister; former Rector, GIMPA
 Kwesi Dickson – former President of Methodist Church Ghana
 Agnes Dordzie – Justice of the Supreme Court of Ghana (2018–2022)
 Jones Victor Mawulorm Dotse – active justice of the Supreme Court of Ghana (2008–) and the Supreme Court of the Gambia (2008–)
 Kwabena Dufuor –former Finance Minister and former Governor of the Bank of Ghana.
 Komla Dumor – television news presenter for the BBC World, presenting BBC World News and Africa Business Report. 2003 winner of Journalist of the Year award given by the Ghana Journalist Association.
 Nana Effah-Apenteng – the Permanent Representative of Ghana to the United Nations between May 2000 and 2007. 
 Ben Ephson - publisher and Managing Editor of the Daily Dispatch
 Akin Euba - Nigerian composer, musicologist and pianist, Andrew Mellon Professor of Music at the University of Pittsburgh.
 Kwabena Frimpong-Boateng – cardiothoracic surgeon and former chief executive officer of the Korle Bu Teaching Hospital, first black African to perform heart transplant and established the National Cardiothoracic Centre, Minister for Environment, Science, Technology and Innovation (2017–present)
 Nasiru Sulemana Gbadegbe – active Justice of the Supreme Court of Ghana (2009–)
 Patrick R. D. Hayford – diplomat, former Ghana Ambassador to South Africa(1997–1999), Director of African Affairs in the Executive Office of United Nations (UN) Secretary-General Kofi Annan(1999–2005)
 Clemence Jackson Honyenuga – Justice of the Supreme Court of Ghana (2020–2022)
Rosemary Hutton – geophysicist and pioneer of magnetotellurics (1954-1961)
 Ken Kanda – diplomat, the Permanent Representative of Ghana to the United Nations.
 Nii Ashie Kotey – An academic and active justice of the Supreme Court of Ghana (2018–)
 Akua Kuenyehia – Vice-President, International Criminal Court (2003–Date)
 John Dramani Mahama – Vice-President of Ghana (2009–12) and President of Ghana (2012–17)
 Samuel Marful-Sau – active Justice of the Supreme Court of Ghana (2018–)
 Vicki Miles-LaGrange (born 1953) – Chief U.S. District Judge for the Western District of Oklahoma, first African-American woman to be U.S. attorney for the Western District of Oklahoma, and the first African-American female elected to the Oklahoma Senate
 John Evans Atta Mills – former Law professor and vice-president of Ghana (1997–2001), President of Ghana (2009–12)
 Tawiah Modibo Ocran – Judge of the Supreme Court of Ghana (2004–2008)
 Isaac Odame  – Physician, University of Toronto professor, and medical researcher in sickle cell disease, thalassemia and other hematological disorders
George Tawia Odamtten – Mycologist
 David Ofori-Adjei – elected to the Council of the Division of Clinical Pharmacology of the International Union of Pharmacology and Clinical Pharmacology in 2000
Walter Samuel Nkanu Onnoghen - Chief Justice of Nigeria (2017–present)
 Aaron Mike Oquaye – former Minister of Communication (2005–09) and Member of Parliament for Dome-Kwabenya (2005 to present), Speaker of Parliament (2017–present)
 Faustina Oware-Gyekye – nursing leader and academic
 Rose Constance Owusu – Justice of the Supreme Court of Ghana (2008 – 2014)
 Bill Puplampu - occupational psychologist and Vice Chancellor of Central University (Ghana)
 Gabriel Pwamang – active Justice of the Supreme Court of Ghana (2015–)
 Nana Akuoko Sarpong - Omanhene of Agogo
 Ebenezer Sekyi-Hughes - Speaker of Parliament of Ghana (7 January 2005 – 6 January 2009)
Samuel Ernest Quarm – retired diplomat
 Elizabeth Frances Sey (1927–1991) first female graduate of the University College of the Gold Coast and pioneering woman educator. A residence hall on the campus is named in her honour.
 Gertrude Torkornoo – active Justice of the Supreme Court of Ghana (2019–)
 Baldwyn Torto – Chemical ecologist
 Tsatsu Tsikata – former Chief Executive of the Ghana National Petroleum Corporation and Law lecturer at the University of Ghana.
Nana Anima Wiafe-Akenten – linguist, the author of the first doctoral dissertation in the Twi language
Kwasi Wiredu — philosopher
 Georgina Theodora Wood – first female Chief Justice of Ghana (since 2007).
 Kgosi Basadi Seipone III

Notable faculty

 Nana Klutse, climate scientist
 Alexander Oppenheim (1968–1973), mathematician
 Faustina Oware-Gyekye, nurse-leader

In popular culture
The university has appeared in several films and television advertisements. The television series Sun City has a lot of scenes of the university. The name of the university has also been referenced in the lyrics of artists in Ghana, including Sarkodie's "Legon Girls", Buk Bak's "Klu blɔfo", Kwadei's "Wutatami" and Okordii's "Four years in Legon". In June 2020 the University of Ghana was resolute to continue with its planned online teaching and learning for the second semester of the 2019/2020 academic year despite the government's plan to reopen schools for final year students.

Controversy 
The management of the university was labeled as 'insensitive' to the hardship caused by the COVID-19 pandemic after the school increased its facility user fees for 2020/21 academic year. It led to a protest on social media and the decision was later reversed. In recent years there has been reports of sexual misconduct levelled against several lectures at the university which the university denied. An investigative documentary was produced by former victims of the sexual harassment which was uploaded YouTube.

References

External links

 

 
Education in Accra
Educational institutions established in 1948
1948 establishments in Gold Coast (British colony)